The Durov Animal Theater or Grandpa Durov's Corner is a circus/theatre in Moscow, Russia. Durov was a well-known animal trainer and zoologist who developed his own system of training, that did not involve any punishment of the animals. His theatre also included a natural history museum and a science laboratory.

The theatre building was designed in 1894 by the architect August Weber. The theatre is currently located in the same facility; the street had been renamed in Durov's honour in 1927.

See also 
 Nadezhda Durova
 Anatoly Durov

References

External links 
 Durov's Animal Theatre Official Website
 The Durov Animal Theatre Moscow.Info
 Durov Animal Theatre (DAT) Destination City Guides By In Your Pocket
 Google Books. Durov Animal Theater  
 Московский театр зверей имени Дурова празднует 105-летие
 Grandpa Durov’s Corner Theatre (The history, What to watch, The repertoire)

Theatre companies in Russia
Theatres in Moscow
Culture in Moscow
Theatres completed in 1912
Cultural heritage monuments of regional significance in Moscow